Craig Low (born 8 May 1985) is an Australian writer, producer, director & comedian. He is known publicly as "Lowie”.

Early life
Low was on born on 8 May 1985 in Helensvale, Queensland. His family grew up in the small community of Helensvale, where he attended Helensvale State Primary School and Helensvale State High School.

Radio
Low began working at 90.9 SeaFM on the Gold Coast when he was 15 years old yrs old as a junior in audio production and was nominated for his first Australian Commercial Radio Award (ACRA). He was put on Mid-Dawns (12am-5am) and then shifted to B105 to host Australian Made, a late night syndicated program (now called Australian First) that plays 100 percent Australian content. Within 6 months of moving to Brisbane, Craig was filling in for the Hot30 Countdown over the summer period. He stayed on to host the show for just under 1 year. Ratings success differed from state to state, but it was regularly the number 1 FM show in the 7pm-12am time slot. Craig and Austereo parted ways in 2006.

Low returned to radio in 2009 with a new show Lowie vs America for the Southern Cross Media Network. The show earned him 3 ACRA Nominations in 2010.

Television
Low has written for several NBC television projects including the clip series The Worst Thing I Ever... for the E! Network. In 2014, Low made his US TV Debut on Fox's stand up comedy series Laughs.

In 2015, Low was cast as a season regular on MTV2's Joking Off. Defy Media has also confirmed a development deal with Lowie with a pilot being green lit under the working title Lowie Sucks for release later this year.

Low signed on with FOX8 in Australia to host Road to Rock Star. The series went around Australia as they hunted for Australia music talent to become hopefuls on the American series titles "Rock Star Supernova". The band consisted of Tommy Lee (Mötley Crüe), Gilby Clarke (Guns N' Roses) and Jason Newsted (Metallica).

CD Live, a Saturday night live countdown show hosted by Low and Asha Keurten on FOX8. Due to run for 13 episodes, but was expanded to 22.

Ralph TV, based on the Australia Men's Magazine Ralph and broadcast on the Nine Network Thursday nights during 2008. The TV series was released on DVD along with the magazine.

Stand Up 
His one-man show Name Dropping with Craig Low debut at the Melbourne International Comedy Festival in 2018 with one reviewer writing “I can tell you first hand it will have you laughing so hard you’ll wish the toilet was 5 foot closer”. Craig was to record his one hour special in March 2020 but it has since been postponed due to the global pandemic.

Acting 
Craig's first role was opposite Heath Ledger in the 1997 TV series Roar. After many various commercial roles he left to focus on School. After moving to LA permanently in 2015, Craig returned to acting with roles in The Muppets, 5 Years Apart, Ghost Story Club on TruTV and short films My Girlfriend From Hell, Accents and Founder.

Directing 
After working as both assistant director and producer for over 80 episodes of television for El Rey Network, Craig made his directorial debut with the horror short film DON’T TOUCH which he also wrote and produced during the quarantine.

Filmography

References

External links
http://www.lowielive.com

1985 births
Living people
Australian male comedians
Australian male film actors
Australian television presenters
Male actors from the Gold Coast, Queensland